Greenfield High School is located in Greenfield, Massachusetts, United States.

The school's mascot is the "Green Wave", represented by a green and white ocean wave.

References

External links
https://www.gpsk12.org/greenfield-high-school

Public high schools in Massachusetts
Schools in Franklin County, Massachusetts
Greenfield, Massachusetts